Origen of Alexandria ( 185 –  253), also known as Origen Adamantius, was an early Christian scholar, ascetic, and theologian who was born and spent the first half of his career in Alexandria. He was a prolific writer who wrote roughly 2,000 treatises in multiple branches of theology, including textual criticism, biblical exegesis and hermeneutics, homiletics, and spirituality. He was one of the most influential and controversial figures in early Christian theology, apologetics, and asceticism. He has been described as "the greatest genius the early church ever produced".

Origen sought martyrdom with his father at a young age but was prevented from turning himself in to the authorities by his mother. When he was eighteen years old, Origen became a catechist at the Catechetical School of Alexandria. He devoted himself to his studies and adopted an ascetic lifestyle. He came into conflict with Demetrius, the bishop of Alexandria, in 231 after he was ordained as a presbyter by his friend, the bishop of Caesarea, while on a journey to Athens through Palestine. Demetrius condemned Origen for insubordination and accused him of having castrated himself and of having taught that even Satan would eventually attain salvation, an accusation which Origen vehemently denied. Origen founded the Christian School of Caesarea, where he taught logic, cosmology, natural history, and theology, and became regarded by the churches of Palestine and Arabia as the ultimate authority on all matters of theology. He was tortured for his faith during the Decian persecution in 250 and died three to four years later from his injuries.

Origen was able to produce a massive quantity of writings because of the patronage of his close friend Ambrose of Alexandria, who provided him with a team of secretaries to copy his works, making him one of the most prolific writers in all of antiquity. His treatise On the First Principles systematically laid out the principles of Christian theology and became the foundation for later theological writings. He also authored Contra Celsum, the most influential work of early Christian apologetics, in which he defended Christianity against the pagan philosopher Celsus, one of its foremost early critics. Origen produced the Hexapla, the first critical edition of the Hebrew Bible, which contained the original Hebrew text as well as four different Greek translations of it, and one Greek transliteration of the Hebrew, all written in columns, side by side. He wrote hundreds of homilies covering almost the entire Bible, interpreting many passages as allegorical. Origen taught that, before the creation of the material universe, God had created the souls of all the intelligent beings. These souls, at first fully devoted to God, fell away from him and were given physical bodies. Origen was the first to propose the ransom theory of atonement in its fully developed form, and he also significantly contributed to the development of the concept of the Trinity. Origen hoped that all people might eventually attain salvation, but was always careful to maintain that this was only speculation. He defended free will and advocated Christian pacifism.

Origen is considered by some Christian groups to be a Church Father; he does not have this status in Orthodox Christianity. He is widely regarded as one of the most influential Christian theologians. His teachings were especially influential in the east, with Athanasius of Alexandria and the three Cappadocian Fathers being among his most devoted followers. Argument over the orthodoxy of Origen's teachings spawned the First Origenist Crisis in the late fourth century, in which he was attacked by Epiphanius of Salamis and Jerome but defended by Tyrannius Rufinus and John of Jerusalem. In 543, Emperor Justinian I condemned him as a heretic and ordered all his writings to be burned. The Second Council of Constantinople in 553 may have anathematized Origen, or it may have only condemned certain heretical teachings which claimed to be derived from Origen. His teachings on the pre-existence of souls were rejected by the Church.

Life

Early years
Almost all information about Origen's life comes from a lengthy biography of him in Book VI of the Ecclesiastical History written by the Christian historian Eusebius ( 260 –  340). Eusebius portrays Origen as the perfect Christian scholar and as a literal saint. Eusebius, however, wrote this account almost fifty years after Origen's death, and had access to few reliable sources on Origen's life, especially his early years. Anxious for more material about his hero, Eusebius recorded events based only on unreliable hearsay evidence, and frequently made speculative inferences about Origen based on the sources he had available. Nonetheless, scholars can reconstruct a general impression of Origen's historical life by sorting out the parts of Eusebius's account that are accurate from those that are inaccurate.

Origen was born in either 185 or 186 AD in Alexandria. Porphyry called him  "a Greek, and educated in Greek literature". According to Eusebius, Origen's father was Leonides of Alexandria, a respected professor of literature and also a devout Christian who practised his religion openly (and later a martyr and saint with a feast day of April 22 in the Catholic church). Joseph Wilson Trigg deems the details of this report unreliable, but admits that Origen's father was certainly at least "a prosperous and thoroughly Hellenized bourgeois". According to John Anthony McGuckin, Origen's mother, whose name is unknown, may have been a member of the lower class who did not have the right of citizenship. It is likely that, on account of his mother's status, Origen was not a Roman citizen. Origen's father taught him about literature and philosophy, and also about the Bible and Christian doctrine. Eusebius states that Origen's father made him memorize passages of scripture daily. Trigg accepts this tradition as possibly genuine, given Origen's ability as an adult to recite extended passages of scripture at will. Eusebius also reports that Origen became so learned about the holy scriptures at an early age that his father was unable to answer his questions.

In 202, when Origen was "not yet seventeen", the Roman Emperor Septimius Severus ordered Roman citizens who openly practised Christianity to be executed. Origen's father Leonides was arrested and thrown in prison. Eusebius reports that Origen wanted to turn himself in to the authorities so that they would execute him as well, but his mother hid all his clothes and he was unable to go to the authorities since he refused to leave the house naked. According to McGuckin, even if Origen had turned himself in, it is unlikely that he would have been punished, since the emperor was only intent on executing Roman citizens. Origen's father was beheaded, and the state confiscated the family's entire property, leaving them impoverished. Origen was the eldest of nine children, and as his father's heir, it became his responsibility to provide for the whole family.

When he was eighteen years old, Origen was appointed as a catechist at the Catechetical School of Alexandria. Many scholars have assumed that Origen became the head of the school, but according to McGuckin, this is highly improbable and it is more likely that he was simply given a paid teaching position, perhaps as a "relief effort" for his destitute family. While employed at the school, he adopted the ascetic lifestyle of the Greek Sophists. He spent the whole day teaching and would stay up late at night writing treatises and commentaries. He went barefoot and only owned one cloak. He did not drink alcohol and ate a simple diet and he often fasted for long periods. Although Eusebius goes to great lengths to portray Origen as one of the Christian monastics of his own era, this portrayal is now generally recognized as anachronistic.

According to Eusebius, as a young man, Origen was taken in by a wealthy Gnostic woman, who was also the patron of a very influential Gnostic theologian from Antioch, who frequently lectured in her home. Eusebius goes to great lengths to insist that, although Origen studied while in her home, he never once "prayed in common" with her or the Gnostic theologian. Later, Origen succeeded in converting a wealthy man named Ambrose from Valentinian Gnosticism to orthodox Christianity. Ambrose was so impressed by the young scholar that he gave Origen a house, a secretary, seven stenographers, a crew of copyists and calligraphers, and paid for all of his writings to be published.

Sometime when he was in his early twenties, Origen sold the small library of Greek literary works which he had inherited from his father for a sum which netted him a daily income of four obols. He used this money to continue his study of the Bible and of philosophy. Origen studied at numerous schools throughout Alexandria, including the Platonic Academy of Alexandria, where he was a student of Ammonius Saccas. Eusebius claims that Origen studied under Clement of Alexandria, but according to McGuckin, this is almost certainly a retrospective assumption based on the similarity of their teachings. Origen rarely mentions Clement in his own writings, and when he does, it is usually to correct him.

Alleged self-castration

Eusebius claims that, as a young man, following a literal reading of Matthew 19:12, in which Jesus is presented as saying "there are eunuchs who have made themselves eunuch for the sake of the kingdom of heaven", Origen either castrated himself or had someone else castrate him in order to ensure his reputation as a respectable tutor to young men and women. Eusebius further alleges that Origen privately told Demetrius, the bishop of Alexandria, about the castration and that Demetrius initially praised him for his devotion to God on account of it. Origen, however, never mentions anything about having castrated himself in any of his surviving writings, and in his exegesis of this verse in his Commentary on the Gospel of Matthew, written near the end of life, he strongly condemns any literal interpretation of Matthew 19:12, asserting that only an idiot would interpret the passage as advocating literal castration.

Since the beginning of the twentieth century, some scholars have questioned the historicity of Origen's self-castration, with many seeing it as a wholesale fabrication. Trigg states that Eusebius's account of Origen's self-castration is certainly true, because Eusebius, who was an ardent admirer of Origen, yet clearly describes the castration as an act of pure folly, would have had no motive to pass on a piece of information that might tarnish Origen's reputation unless it was "notorious and beyond question." Trigg sees Origen's condemnation of the literal interpretation of Matthew 19:12 as him "tacitly repudiating the literalistic reading he had acted on in his youth."

In sharp contrast, McGuckin dismisses Eusebius's story of Origen's self-castration as "hardly credible", seeing it as a deliberate attempt by Eusebius to distract from more serious questions regarding the orthodoxy of Origen's teachings. McGuckin also states, "We have no indication that the motive of castration for respectability was ever regarded as standard by a teacher of mixed-gender classes". He adds that Origen's female students (whom Eusebius lists by name) would have been accompanied by attendants at all times, meaning that Origen would have had no good reason to think that anyone would suspect him of impropriety. Henry Chadwick argues that, while Eusebius's story may be true, it seems unlikely, given that Origen's exposition of Matthew 19:12 "strongly deplored any literal interpretation of the words". Instead, Chadwick suggests, "Perhaps Eusebius was uncritically reporting malicious gossip retailed by Origen's enemies, of whom there were many." However, many noted historians, such as Peter Brown and William Placher, continue to find no reason to conclude that the story is false. Placher theorizes that, if it is true, it may have followed an episode in which Origen received some raised eyebrows while privately tutoring a woman.

Travels and early writings

In his early twenties Origen became less interested in work as a grammarian and more interested in operating as a rhetor-philosopher. He gave his job as a catechist to his younger colleague Heraclas. Meanwhile, Origen began to style himself as a "master of philosophy". Origen's new position as a self-styled Christian philosopher brought him into conflict with Demetrius, the bishop of Alexandria. Demetrius, a charismatic leader who ruled the Christian congregation of Alexandria with an iron fist, became the most direct promoter of the elevation in status of the bishop of Alexandria; prior to Demetrius, the bishop of Alexandria had merely been a priest who was elected to represent his fellows, but after Demetrius, the bishop was seen as clearly a rank higher than his fellow priests. By styling himself as an independent philosopher, Origen was reviving a role that had been prominent in earlier Christianity but which challenged the authority of the now-powerful bishop.

Meanwhile, Origen began composing his massive theological treatise On the First Principles, a landmark book which systematically laid out the foundations of Christian theology for centuries to come. Origen also began travelling abroad to visit schools across the Mediterranean. In 212 he travelled to Rome – a major center of philosophy at the time. In Rome, Origen attended lectures by Hippolytus of Rome and was influenced by his logos theology. In 213 or 214 the governor of Arabia sent a message to the prefect of Egypt requesting him to send Origen to meet with him so that he could interview him and learn more about Christianity from its leading intellectual. Origen, escorted by official bodyguards, spent a short time in Arabia with the governor before returning to Alexandria.

In the autumn of 215 the Roman Emperor Caracalla visited Alexandria. During the visit, the students at the schools there protested and made fun of him for having murdered his brother Geta (died 211). Caracalla, incensed, ordered his troops to ravage the city, execute the governor, and kill all the protesters. He also commanded them to expel all the teachers and intellectuals from the city. Origen fled Alexandria and traveled to the city of Caesarea Maritima in the Roman province of Palestine, where the bishops Theoctistus of Caesarea and Alexander of Jerusalem became his devoted admirers and asked him to deliver discourses on the scriptures in their respective churches. This effectively amounted to letting Origen deliver homilies, even though he was not formally ordained. While this was an unexpected phenomenon, especially given Origen's international fame as a teacher and philosopher, it infuriated Demetrius, who saw it as a direct undermining of his authority. Demetrius sent deacons from Alexandria to demand that the Palestinian hierarchs immediately return "his" catechist to Alexandria. He also issued a decree chastising the Palestinians for allowing a person who was not ordained to preach. The Palestinian bishops, in turn, issued their own condemnation, accusing Demetrius of being jealous of Origen's fame and prestige.

Origen obeyed Demetrius's order and returned to Alexandria, bringing with him an antique scroll he had purchased at Jericho containing the full text of the Hebrew Bible. The manuscript, which had purportedly been found "in a jar", became the source text for one of the two Hebrew columns in Origen's Hexapla. Origen studied the Old Testament in great depth; Eusebius even claims that Origen learned Hebrew. Most modern scholars regard this claim as implausible, but they disagree over how much Origen actually knew about the language. H. Lietzmann concludes that Origen probably only knew the Hebrew alphabet and not much else, whereas R. P. C. Hanson and G. Bardy argue that Origen had a superficial understanding of the language but not enough to have composed the entire Hexapla. A note in Origen's On the First Principles mentions an unknown "Hebrew master", but this was probably a consultant, not a teacher.

Origen also studied the entire New Testament, but especially the epistles of the apostle Paul and the Gospel of John, the writings which Origen regarded as the most important and authoritative. At Ambrose's request, Origen composed the first five books of his exhaustive Commentary on the Gospel of John, He also wrote the first eight books of his Commentary on Genesis, his Commentary on Psalms 1–25, and his Commentary on Lamentations. In addition to these commentaries, Origen also wrote two books on the resurrection of Jesus and ten books of Stromata (miscellanies). It is likely that these works contained much theological speculation, which brought Origen into even greater conflict with Demetrius.

Conflict with Demetrius and removal to Caesarea

Origen repeatedly asked Demetrius to ordain him as a priest, but Demetrius continually refused. In around 231, Demetrius sent Origen on a mission to Athens. Along the way, Origen stopped in Caesarea, where he was warmly greeted by the bishops Theoctistus of Caesarea and Alexander of Jerusalem, who had become his close friends during his previous stay. While he was visiting Caesarea, Origen asked Theoctistus to ordain him as a priest. Theoctistus gladly complied. Upon learning of Origen's ordination, Demetrius was outraged and issued a condemnation declaring that Origen's ordination by a foreign bishop was an act of insubordination.

Eusebius reports that as a result of Demetrius's condemnations, Origen decided not to return to Alexandria and instead to take up permanent residence in Caesarea. John Anthony McGuckin, however, argues that Origen had probably already been planning to stay in Caesarea. The Palestinian bishops declared Origen the chief theologian of Caesarea. Firmilian, the bishop of Caesarea Mazaca in Cappadocia, was such a devoted disciple of Origen that he begged him to come to Cappadocia and teach there.

Demetrius raised a storm of protests against the bishops of Palestine and the church synod in Rome. According to Eusebius, Demetrius published the allegation that Origen had secretly castrated himself, a capital offense under Roman law at the time and one which would have made Origen's ordination invalid, since eunuchs were forbidden from becoming priests. Demetrius also alleged that Origen had taught an extreme form of apokatastasis, which held that all beings, including even Satan himself, would eventually attain salvation. This allegation probably arose from a misunderstanding of Origen's argument during a debate with the Valentinian Gnostic teacher Candidus. Candidus had argued in favor of predestination by declaring that the Devil was beyond salvation. Origen had responded by arguing that, if the Devil is destined for eternal damnation, it was on account of his actions, which were the result of his own free will. Therefore, Origen had declared that Satan was only morally reprobate, not absolutely reprobate.

Demetrius died in 232, less than a year after Origen's departure from Alexandria. The accusations against Origen faded with the death of Demetrius, but they did not disappear entirely and they continued to haunt him for the rest of his career. Origen defended himself in his Letter to Friends in Alexandria, in which he vehemently denied that he had ever taught that the Devil would attain salvation and insisted that the very notion of the Devil attaining salvation was simply ludicrous.

Work and teaching in Caesarea

During his early years in Caesarea, Origen's primary task was the establishment of a Christian School; Caesarea had long been seen as a center of learning for Jews and Hellenistic philosophers, but until Origen's arrival, it had lacked a Christian center of higher education. According to Eusebius, the school Origen founded was primarily targeted towards young pagans who had expressed interest in Christianity but were not yet ready to ask for baptism. The school therefore sought to explain Christian teachings through Middle Platonism. Origen started his curriculum by teaching his students classical Socratic reasoning. After they had mastered this, he taught them cosmology and natural history. Finally, once they had mastered all of these subjects, he taught them theology, which was the highest of all philosophies, the accumulation of everything they had previously learned.

With the establishment of the Caesarean school, Origen's reputation as a scholar and theologian reached its zenith and he became known throughout the Mediterranean world as a brilliant intellectual. The hierarchs of the Palestinian and Arabian church synods regarded Origen as the ultimate expert on all matters dealing with theology. While teaching in Caesarea, Origen resumed work on his Commentary on John, composing at least books six through ten. In the first of these books, Origen compares himself to "an Israelite who has escaped the perverse persecution of the Egyptians." Origen also wrote the treatise On Prayer at the request of his friend Ambrose and Tatiana (referred to as the "sister" of Ambrose), in which he analyzes the different types of prayers described in the Bible and offers a detailed exegesis on the Lord's Prayer.

Pagans also took a fascination with Origen. The Neoplatonist philosopher Porphyry heard of Origen's fame and traveled to Caesarea to listen to his lectures. Porphyry recounts that Origen had extensively studied the teachings of Pythagoras, Plato, and Aristotle, but also those of important Middle Platonists, Neopythagoreans, and Stoics, including Numenius of Apamea, Chronius, Apollophanes, Longinus, Moderatus of Gades, Nicomachus, Chaeremon, and Cornutus. Nonetheless, Porphyry accused Origen of having betrayed true philosophy by subjugating its insights to the exegesis of the Christian scriptures. Eusebius reports that Origen was summoned from Caesarea to Antioch at the behest of Julia Avita Mamaea, the mother of Roman Emperor Severus Alexander, "to discuss Christian philosophy and doctrine with her."

In 235, approximately three years after Origen began teaching in Caesarea, Alexander Severus, who had been tolerant towards Christians, was murdered and Emperor Maximinus Thrax instigated a purge of all those who had supported his predecessor. His pogroms targeted Christian leaders and, in Rome, Pope Pontianus and Hippolytus of Rome were both sent into exile. Origen knew that he was in danger and went into hiding in the home of a faithful Christian woman named Juliana the Virgin, who had been a student of the Ebionite leader Symmachus. Origen's close friend and longtime patron Ambrose was arrested in Nicomedia, and Protoctetes, the leading priest in Caesarea, was also arrested. In their honor, Origen composed his treatise Exhortation to Martyrdom, which is now regarded as one of the greatest classics of Christian resistance literature. After coming out of hiding following Maximinus's death, Origen founded a school of which Gregory Thaumaturgus, later bishop of Pontus, was one of the pupils. He preached regularly on Wednesdays and Fridays, and later daily.

Later life

Sometime between 238 and 244, Origen visited Athens, where he completed his Commentary on the Book of Ezekiel and began writing his Commentary on the Song of Songs. After visiting Athens, he visited Ambrose in Nicomedia. According to Porphyry, Origen also travelled to Rome or Antioch, where he met Plotinus, the founder of Neoplatonism. The Christians of the eastern Mediterranean continued to revere Origen as the most orthodox of all theologians, and when the Palestinian hierarchs learned that Beryllus, the bishop of Bostra and one of the most energetic Christian leaders of the time, had been preaching adoptionism (the belief that Jesus was born human and only became divine after his baptism), they sent Origen to convert him to orthodoxy. Origen engaged Beryllus in a public disputation, which went so successfully that Beryllus promised only to teach Origen's theology from then on. On another occasion, a Christian leader in Arabia named Heracleides began teaching that the soul was mortal and that it perished with the body. Origen refuted these teachings, arguing that the soul is immortal and can never die.

In  249, the Plague of Cyprian broke out. In 250, Emperor Decius, believing that the plague was caused by Christians' failure to recognise him as divine, issued a decree for Christians to be persecuted. This time Origen did not escape. Eusebius recounts how Origen suffered "bodily tortures and torments under the iron collar and in the dungeon; and how for many days with his feet stretched four spaces in the stocks". The governor of Caesarea gave very specific orders that Origen was not to be killed until he had publicly renounced his faith in Christ. Origen endured two years of imprisonment and torture, but obstinately refused to renounce his faith. In June 251, Decius was killed fighting the Goths in the Battle of Abritus, and Origen was released from prison. Nonetheless, Origen's health was broken by the physical tortures enacted on him, and he died less than a year later at the age of sixty-nine. A later legend, recounted by Jerome and numerous itineraries, places his death and burial at Tyre, but little value can be attached to this.

Works

Exegetical writings
Origen was an extremely prolific writer. According to Epiphanius, he wrote a grand total of roughly 6,000 works over the course of his lifetime. Most scholars agree that this estimate is probably somewhat exaggerated. According to Jerome, Eusebius listed the titles of just under 2,000 treatises written by Origen in his lost Life of Pamphilus. Jerome compiled an abbreviated list of Origen's major treatises, itemizing 800 different titles.

By far the most important work of Origen on textual criticism was the Hexapla ("Sixfold"), a massive comparative study of various translations of the Old Testament in six columns: Hebrew, Hebrew in Greek characters, the Septuagint, and the Greek translations of Theodotion (a Jewish scholar from  180 AD), Aquila of Sinope (another Jewish scholar from  117–138), and Symmachus (an Ebionite scholar from  193–211). Origen was the first Christian scholar to introduce critical markers to a Biblical text. He marked the Septuagint column of the Hexapla using signs adapted from those used by the textual critics of the Great Library of Alexandria: a passage found in the Septuagint that was not found in the Hebrew text would be marked with an asterisk (*) and a passage that was found in other Greek translations, but not in the Septuagint, would be marked with an obelus (÷).

The Hexapla was the cornerstone of the Great Library of Caesarea, which Origen founded. It was still the centerpiece of the library's collection by the time of Jerome, who records having used it in his letters on multiple occasions. When Emperor Constantine the Great ordered fifty complete copies of the Bible to be transcribed and disseminated across the empire, Eusebius used the Hexapla as the master copy for the Old Testament. Although the original Hexapla has been lost, the text of it has survived in numerous fragments and a more-or-less complete Syriac translation of the Greek column, made by the seventh-century bishop Paul of Tella, has also survived. For some sections of the Hexapla, Origen included additional columns containing other Greek translations; for the Book of Psalms, he included no less than eight Greek translations, making this section known as Enneapla ("Ninefold"). Origen also produced the Tetrapla ("Fourfold"), a smaller, abridged version of the Hexapla containing only the four Greek translations and not the original Hebrew text.

According to Jerome's Epistle 33, Origen wrote extensive scholia on the books of Exodus, Leviticus, Isaiah, Psalms 1–15, Ecclesiastes, and the Gospel of John. None of these scholia have survived intact, but parts of them were incorporated into the Catenaea, a collection of excerpts from major works of Biblical commentary written by the Church Fathers. Other fragments of the scholia are preserved in Origen's Philocalia and in Pamphilus of Caesarea's apology for Origen. The Stromateis were of a similar character, and the margin of Codex Athous Laura, 184, contains citations from this work on Romans 9:23; I Corinthians 6:14, 7:31, 34, 9:20–21, 10:9, besides a few other fragments. Origen composed homilies covering almost the entire Bible. There are 205, and possibly 279, homilies of Origen that are extant either in Greek or in Latin translations.

The homilies preserved are on Genesis (16), Exodus (13), Leviticus (16), Numbers (28), Joshua (26), Judges (9), I Sam. (2), Psalms 36–38 (9), Canticles (2), Isaiah (9), Jeremiah (7 Greek, 2 Latin, 12 Greek and Latin), Ezekiel (14), and Luke (39). The homilies were preached in the church at Caesarea, with the exception of the two on 1 Samuel which were delivered in Jerusalem. Nautin has argued that they were all preached in a three-year liturgical cycle some time between 238 and 244, preceding the Commentary on the Song of Songs, where Origen refers to homilies on Judges, Exodus, Numbers, and a work on Leviticus. On June 11, 2012, the Bavarian State Library announced that the Italian philologist Marina Molin Pradel had discovered twenty-nine previously unknown homilies by Origen in a twelfth-century Byzantine manuscript from their collection. Prof. Lorenzo Perrone of Bologna University and other experts confirmed the authenticity of the homilies. The texts of these manuscripts can be found online.

Origen is the main source of information on the use of the texts that were later officially canonized as the New Testament. The information used to create the late-fourth-century Easter Letter, which declared accepted Christian writings, was probably based on the lists given in Eusebius's Ecclesiastical History HE 3:25 and 6:25, which were both primarily based on information provided by Origen. Origen accepted the authenticity of the epistles of 1 John, 1 Peter, and Jude without question and accepted the Epistle of James as authentic with only slight hesitation. He also refers to 2 John, 3 John, and 2 Peter but notes that all three were suspected to be forgeries. Origen may have also considered other writings to be "inspired" that were rejected by later authors, including the Epistle of Barnabas, Shepherd of Hermas, and 1 Clement. "Origen is not the originator of the idea of biblical canon, but he certainly gives the philosophical and literary–interpretative underpinnings for the whole notion."

Extant commentaries

Origen's commentaries written on specific books of scripture are much more focused on systematic exegesis than his homilies. In these writings, Origen applies the precise critical methodology that had been developed by the scholars of the Mouseion in Alexandria to the Christian scriptures. The commentaries also display Origen's impressive encyclopedic knowledge of various subjects and his ability to cross-reference specific words, listing every place in which a word appears in the scriptures along with all the word's known meanings, a feat made all the more impressive by the fact that he did this in a time when Bible concordances had not yet been compiled. Origen's massive Commentary on the Gospel of John, which spanned more than thirty-two volumes once it was completed, was written with the specific intention not only to expound the correct interpretation of the scriptures, but also to refute the interpretations of the Valentinian Gnostic teacher Heracleon, who had used the Gospel of John to support his argument that there were really two gods, not one. Of the original thirty-two books in the Commentary on John, only nine have been preserved: Books I, II, VI, X, XIII, XX, XXVIII, XXXII, and a fragment of XIX.

Of the original twenty-five books in Origen's Commentary on the Gospel of Matthew, only eight have survived in the original Greek (Books 10–17), covering Matthew 13.36–22.33. An anonymous Latin translation beginning at the point corresponding to Book 12, Chapter 9 of the Greek text and covering Matthew 16.13–27.66 has also survived. The translation contains parts that are not found in the original Greek and is missing parts that are found in it. Origen's Commentary on the Gospel of Matthew was universally regarded as a classic, even after his condemnation, and it ultimately became the work which established the Gospel of Matthew as the primary gospel. Origen's Commentary on the Epistle to the Romans was originally fifteen books long, but only tiny fragments of it have survived in the original Greek. An abbreviated Latin translation in ten books was produced by the monk Tyrannius Rufinus at the end of the fourth century. The historian Socrates Scholasticus records that Origen had included an extensive discussion of the application of the title theotokos to the Virgin Mary in his commentary, but this discussion is not found in Rufinus's translation, probably because Rufinus did not approve of Origen's position on the matter, whatever that might have been.

Origen also composed a Commentary on the Song of Songs, in which he took explicit care to explain why the Song of Songs was relevant to a Christian audience. The Commentary on the Song of Songs was Origen's most celebrated commentary and Jerome famously writes in his preface to his translation of two of Origen's homilies over the Song of Songs that "In his other works, Origen habitually excels others. In this commentary, he excelled himself." Origen expanded on the exegesis of the Jewish Rabbi Akiva, interpreting the Song of Songs as a mystical allegory in which the bridegroom represents the Logos and the bride represents the soul of the believer. This was the first Christian commentary to expound such an interpretation and it became extremely influential on later interpretations of the Song of Songs. Despite this, the commentary now only survives in part through a Latin translation of it made by Tyrannius Rufinus in 410. Fragments of some other commentaries survive. Citations in Origen's Philokalia include fragments of the third book of the commentary on Genesis. There is also Ps. i, iv.1, the small commentary on Canticles, and the second book of the large commentary on the same, the twentieth book of the commentary on Ezekiel, and the commentary on Hosea. Of the non-extant commentaries, there is limited evidence of their arrangement.

On the First Principles
Origen's On the First Principles was the first ever systematic exposition of Christian theology. He composed it as a young man between 220 and 230 while he was still living in Alexandria. Fragments from Books 3.1 and 4.1–3 of Origen's Greek original are preserved in Origen's Philokalia. A few smaller quotations of the original Greek are preserved in Justinian's Letter to Mennas. The vast majority of the text has only survived in a heavily abridged Latin translation produced by Tyrannius Rufinus in 397. On the First Principles begins with an essay explaining the nature of theology. Book One describes the heavenly world and includes descriptions of the oneness of God, the relationship between the three persons of the Trinity, the nature of the divine spirit, reason, and angels. Book Two describes the world of man, including the incarnation of the Logos, the soul, free will, and eschatology. Book Three deals with cosmology, sin, and redemption. Book Four deals with teleology and the interpretation of the scriptures.

Against Celsus

Against Celsus (Greek: Κατὰ Κέλσου; Latin: Contra Celsum), preserved entirely in Greek, was Origen's last treatise, written about 248. It is an apologetic work defending orthodox Christianity against the attacks of the pagan philosopher Celsus, who was seen in the ancient world as early Christianity's foremost opponent. In 178, Celsus had written a polemic entitled On the True Word, in which he had made numerous arguments against Christianity. The church had responded by ignoring Celsus's attacks, but Origen's patron Ambrose brought the matter to his attention. Origen initially wanted to ignore Celsus and let his attacks fade, but one of Celsus's major claims, which held that no self-respecting philosopher of the Platonic tradition would ever be so stupid as to become a Christian, provoked him to write a rebuttal.

In the book, Origen systematically refutes each of Celsus' arguments point-by-point and argues for a rational basis of Christian faith. Origen draws heavily on the teachings of Plato and argues that Christianity and Greek philosophy are not incompatible, and that philosophy contains much that is true and admirable, but that the Bible contains far greater wisdom than anything Greek philosophers could ever grasp. Origen responds to Celsus's accusation that Jesus had performed his miracles using magic rather than divine powers by asserting that, unlike magicians, Jesus had not performed his miracles for show, but rather to reform his audiences. Contra Celsum became the most influential of all early Christian apologetics works; before it was written, Christianity was seen by many as merely a folk religion for the illiterate and uneducated, but Origen raised it to a level of academic respectability. Eusebius admired Against Celsus so much that, in his Against Hierocles 1, he declared that Against Celsus provided an adequate rebuttal to all criticisms the church would ever face.

Other writings
Between 232 and 235, while in Caesarea in Palestine, Origen wrote On Prayer, of which the full text has been preserved in the original Greek. After an introduction on the object, necessity, and advantage of prayer, he ends with an exegesis of the Lord's Prayer, concluding with remarks on the position, place, and attitude to be assumed during prayer, as well as on the classes of prayer. On Martyrdom, or the Exhortation to Martyrdom, also preserved entire in Greek, was written some time after the beginning of the persecution of Maximinus in the first half of 235. In it, Origen warns against any trifling with idolatry and emphasises the duty of suffering martyrdom manfully, while in the second part he explains the meaning of martyrdom.

The papyri discovered at Tura in 1941 contained the Greek texts of two previously unknown works of Origen. Neither work can be dated precisely, though both were probably written after the persecution of Maximinus in 235. One is On the Pascha. The other is Dialogue with Heracleides, a record written by one of Origen's stenographers of a debate between Origen and the Arabian bishop Heracleides, a quasi-Monarchianist who taught that the Father and the Son were the same. In the dialogue, Origen uses Socratic questioning to persuade Heracleides to believe in the "Logos theology", in which the Son or Logos is a separate entity from God the Father. The debate between Origen and Heracleides, and Origen's responses in particular, has been noted for its unusually cordial and respectful nature in comparison to the much fiercer polemics of Tertullian or the fourth-century debates between Trinitarians and Arians.

Lost works include two books on the Resurrection, written before On First Principles, and also two dialogues on the same theme dedicated to Ambrose. Eusebius had a collection of more than one hundred letters of Origen, and the list of Jerome speaks of several books of his epistles. Except for a few fragments, only three letters have been preserved. The first, partly preserved in the Latin translation of Rufinus, is addressed to friends in Alexandria. The second is a short letter to Gregory Thaumaturgus, preserved in the Philocalia. The third is an epistle to Sextus Julius Africanus, extant in Greek, replying to a letter from Africanus (also extant), and defending the authenticity of the Greek additions to the book of Daniel. Forgeries of the writings of Origen made in his lifetime are discussed by Rufinus in De adulteratione librorum Origenis. The Dialogus de recta in Deum fide, the Philosophumena attributed to Hippolytus of Rome, and the Commentary on Job by Julian the Arian have also been ascribed to him.

Views

Christology

Origen writes that Jesus was "the firstborn of all creation [who] assumed a body and a human soul." He firmly believed that Jesus had a human soul and abhorred docetism (the teaching which held that Jesus had come to Earth in spirit form rather than a physical human body). Origen envisioned Jesus' human nature as the one soul that stayed closest to God and remained perfectly faithful to Him, even when all other souls fell away. At Jesus's incarnation, his soul became fused with the Logos and they "intermingled" to become one. Thus, according to Origen, Christ was both human and divine, but like all human souls, Christ's human nature was existent from the beginning.

Origen was the first to propose the ransom theory of atonement in its fully developed form, although Irenaeus had previously proposed a prototypical form of it. According to this theory, Christ's death on the cross was a ransom to Satan in exchange for humanity's liberation. This theory holds that Satan was tricked by God because Christ was not only free of sin, but also the incarnate Deity, whom Satan lacked the ability to enslave. The theory was later expanded by theologians such as Gregory of Nyssa and Rufinus of Aquileia. In the eleventh century, Anselm of Canterbury criticized the ransom theory, along with the associated Christus Victor theory, resulting in the theory's decline in western Europe. The theory has nonetheless retained some of its popularity in the Eastern Orthodox Church.

Cosmology and Eschatology

One of Origen's main teachings was the doctrine of the preexistence of souls, which held that before God created the material world he created a vast number of incorporeal "spiritual intelligences" (ψυχαί). All of these souls were at first devoted to the contemplation and love of their Creator, but as the fervor of the divine fire cooled, almost all of these intelligences eventually grew bored of contemplating God, and their love for him "cooled off" (ψύχεσθαι). When God created the world, the souls which had previously existed without bodies became incarnate. Those whose love for God diminished the most became demons. Those whose love diminished moderately became human souls, eventually to be incarnated in fleshly bodies. Those whose love diminished the least became angels. One soul, however, who remained perfectly devoted to God became, through love, one with the Word (Logos) of God. The Logos eventually took flesh and was born of the Virgin Mary, becoming the God-man Jesus Christ.
In recent years it has been questioned whether Origen believed this, being in reality a belief of his disciples and a misrepresentation of Justinian, Epiphanius and others.

Origen may or may not have believed in the Platonic teaching of metempsychosis ("the transmigration of souls"; i.e. reincarnation). He explicitly rejects "the false doctrine of the transmigration of souls into bodies", but this may refer only to a specific kind of transmigration. Geddes MacGregor has argued that Origen must have believed in metempsychosis because it makes sense within his eschatology and is never explicitly denied in the Bible. Roger E. Olson, however, dismisses the view that Origen believed in reincarnation as a New Age misunderstanding of Origen's teachings. It is certain that Origen rejected the Stoic doctrine of eternal return, although he did posit the existence of a series of non-identical worlds.

Origen believed that, eventually, the whole world would be converted to Christianity, "since the world is continually gaining possession of more souls." He believed that the Kingdom of Heaven was not yet come, but that it was the duty of every Christian to make the eschatological reality of the kingdom present in their lives. Origen is often believed to be a Universalist, who suggested that all people might eventually attain salvation, but only after being purged of their sins through "divine fire". This, of course, in line of Origen's allegorical interpretation, was not literal fire, but rather the inner anguish of knowing one's own sins. Origen was also careful to maintain that universal salvation was merely a possibility and not a definitive doctrine. Jerome quotes Origen as having allegedly written that "after aeons and the one restoration of all things, the state of Gabriel will be the same as that of the Devil, Paul's as that of Caiaphas, that of virgins as that of prostitutes." However, Origen expressly states in his Letter to Friends in Alexandria that Satan and "those who are cast out of the kingdom of God" would be not included in the final salvation.

Ethics

Origen was an ardent believer in free will, and he adamantly rejected the Valentinian idea of election. Instead, Origen believed that even disembodied souls have the power to make their own decisions. Furthermore, in his interpretation of the story of Jacob and Esau, Origen argues that the condition into which a person is born is actually dependent upon what their souls did in this pre-existent state. According to Origen, the superficial unfairness of a person's condition at birth—with some humans being poor, others rich, some being sick, and others healthy—is actually a by-product of what the person's soul had done in the pre-existent state. Origen defends free will in his interpretations of instances of divine foreknowledge in the scriptures, arguing that Jesus's knowledge of Judas's future betrayal in the gospels and God's knowledge of Israel's future disobedience in the Deuteronomistic history only show that God knew these events would happen in advance. Origen therefore concludes that the individuals involved in these incidents still made their decisions out of their own free will. Like Plato, Plotinus and Gregory of Nyssa, Origen understands that only the agent who chooses the Good is free; choosing evil is never free but slavery.

Origen was an ardent pacifist, and in his Against Celsus, he argued that Christianity's inherent pacifism was one of the most outwardly noticeable aspects of the religion. While Origen did admit that some Christians served in the Roman army, he pointed out that most did not and insisted that engaging in earthly wars was against the way of Christ. Origen accepted that it was sometimes necessary for a non-Christian state to wage wars but insisted that it was impossible for a Christian to fight in such a war without compromising his or her faith, since Christ had absolutely forbidden violence of any kind. Origen explained the violence found in certain passages of the Old Testament as allegorical and pointed out Old Testament passages which he interpreted as supporting nonviolence, such as Psalm 7:4–6 and Lamentations 3:27–29. Origen maintained that, if everyone were peaceful and loving like Christians, then there would be no wars and the Empire would not need a military.

Hermeneutics

Origen bases his theology on the Christian scriptures and does not appeal to Platonic teachings without having first supported his argument with a scriptural basis. He saw the scriptures as divinely inspired and was cautious never to contradict his own interpretation of what was written in them. Nonetheless, Origen did have a penchant for speculating beyond what was explicitly stated in the Bible, and this habit frequently placed him in the hazy realm between strict orthodoxy and heresy.

According to Origen, there are two kinds of Biblical literature which are found in both the Old and New Testaments: historia ("history, or narrative") and nomothesia ("legislation or ethical prescription"). Origen expressly states that the Old and New Testaments should be read together and according to the same rules. Origen further taught that there were three different ways in which passages of scripture could be interpreted. The "flesh" was the literal, historical interpretation of the passage; the "soul" was the moral message behind the passage; and the "spirit" was the eternal, incorporeal reality that the passage conveyed. In Origen's exegesis, the Book of Proverbs, Ecclesiastes, and the Song of Songs represent perfect examples of the bodily, soulful, and spiritual components of scripture respectively.

Origen saw the "spiritual" interpretation as the deepest and most important meaning of the text and taught that some passages held no literal meaning at all and that their meanings were purely allegorical. Nonetheless, he stressed that "the passages which are historically true are far more numerous than those which are composed with purely spiritual meanings" and often used examples from corporeal realities. Origen noticed that the accounts of Jesus's life in the four canonical gospels contain irreconcilable contradictions, but he argued that these contradictions did not undermine the spiritual meanings of the passages in question. Origen's idea of a twofold creation was based on an allegorical interpretation of the creation story found in the first two chapters of the Book of Genesis. The first creation, described in Genesis 1:26, was the creation of the primeval spirits, who are made "in the image of God" and are therefore incorporeal like Him; the second creation described in Genesis 2:7 is when the human souls are given ethereal, spiritual bodies and the description in Genesis 3:21 of God clothing Adam and Eve in "tunics of skin" refers to the transformation of these spiritual bodies into corporeal ones. Thus, each phase represents a degradation from the original state of incorporeal holiness.

Theology

Origen's conception of God the Father is apophatic—a perfect unity, invisible and incorporeal, transcending all things material, and therefore inconceivable and incomprehensible. He is likewise unchangeable and transcends space and time. But his power is limited by his goodness, justice, and wisdom; and, though entirely free from necessity, his goodness and omnipotence constrained him to reveal himself. This revelation, the external self-emanation of God, is expressed by Origen in various ways, the Logos being only one of many. The revelation was the first creation of God (cf. Proverbs 8:22), in order to afford creative mediation between God and the world, such mediation being necessary, because God, as changeless unity, could not be the source of a multitudinous creation.

The Logos is the rational creative principle that permeates the universe. The Logos acts on all human beings through their capacity for logic and rational thought, guiding them to the truth of God's revelation. As they progress in their rational thinking, all humans become more like Christ. Nonetheless, they retain their individuality and do not become subsumed into Christ. Creation came into existence only through the Logos, and God's nearest approach to the world is the command to create. While the Logos is substantially a unity, he comprehends a multiplicity of concepts, so that Origen terms him, in Platonic fashion, "essence of essences" and "idea of ideas".

Origen significantly contributed to the development of the idea of the Trinity. He declared the Holy Spirit to be a part of the Godhead and interpreted the Parable of the Lost Coin to mean that the Holy Spirit dwells within each and every person and that the inspiration of the Holy Spirit was necessary for any kind of speech dealing with God. Origen taught that the activity of all three parts of the Trinity was necessary for a person to attain salvation.

In one fragment preserved by Rufinus in his Latin translation of Pamphilus's Defense of Origen, Origen seems to apply the phrase homooúsios (ὁμοούσιος; "of the same substance") to the relationship between the Father and the Son. But Williams states that it is impossible to verify whether the quote that uses the word homoousios really comes from Pamphilus at all, let alone Origen.

In other passages, Origen rejected the belief that the Son and the Father were one hypostasis as heretical. According to Rowan Williams, because the words ousia and hypostasis were used synonymously in Origen's time, Origen almost certainly would have rejected homoousios, as a description for the relationship between the Father and the Son, as heretical.

Nonetheless, Origen was a subordinationist, meaning he believed that the Father was superior to the Son and the Son was superior to the Holy Spirit, a model based on Platonic proportions. Jerome records that Origen had written that God the Father is invisible to all beings, including even the Son and the Holy Spirit, and that the Son is invisible to the Holy Spirit as well. At one point Origen suggests that the Son was created by the Father and that the Holy Spirit was created by the Son, but, at another point, he writes that "Up to the present I have been able to find no passage in the Scriptures that the Holy Spirit is a created being." At the time when Origen was alive, orthodox views on the Trinity had not yet been formulated and subordinationism was not yet considered heretical. In fact, virtually all orthodox theologians prior to the Arian controversy in the latter half of the fourth century were subordinationists to some extent. Origen's subordinationism may have developed out of his efforts to defend the unity of God against the Gnostics.

Influence on the Later Church

Before the Crises
Origen is often seen as the first major Christian theologian. Though his orthodoxy had been questioned in Alexandria while he was alive, after Origen's death Pope Dionysius of Alexandria became one of the foremost proponents of Origen's theology. Every Christian theologian who came after him was influenced by his theology, whether directly or indirectly. Origen's contributions to theology were so vast and complex, however, that his followers frequently emphasized drastically different parts of his teachings to the expense of other parts. Dionysius emphasized Origen's subordinationist views, which led  Dionysius to deny the unity of the Trinity, causing controversy throughout North Africa. At the same time, Origen's other disciple Theognostus of Alexandria taught that the Father and the Son were "of one substance".

For centuries after his death, Origen was regarded as the bastion of orthodoxy, and his philosophy practically defined Eastern Christianity. Origen was revered as one of the greatest of all Christian teachers; he was especially beloved by monks, who saw themselves as continuing in Origen's ascetic legacy. As time progressed, however, Origen became criticized under the standard of orthodoxy in later eras, rather than the standards of his own lifetime. In the early fourth century, the Christian writer Methodius of Olympus criticized some of Origen's more speculative arguments but otherwise agreed with Origen on all other points of theology. Peter of Antioch and Eustathius of Antioch criticized Origen as heretical.

Both orthodox and heterodox theologians claimed to be following in the tradition Origen had established. Athanasius of Alexandria, the most prominent supporter of the Holy Trinity at the First Council of Nicaea, was deeply influenced by Origen, and so were Basil of Caesarea, Gregory of Nyssa, and Gregory of Nazianzus (the so-called "Cappadocian Fathers"). At the same time, Origen deeply influenced Arius of Alexandria and later followers of Arianism. Although the extent of the relationship between the two is debated, in antiquity, many orthodox Christians believed that Origen was the true and ultimate source of the Arian heresy.

First Origenist Crisis

The First Origenist Crisis began in the late fourth century, coinciding with the beginning of monasticism in Palestine. The first stirring of the controversy came from the Cyprian bishop Epiphanius of Salamis, who was determined to root out all heresies and refute them. Epiphanius attacked Origen in his anti-heretical treatises Ancoratus (375) and Panarion (376), compiling a list of teachings Origen had espoused that Epiphanius regarded as heretical. Epiphanius's treatises portray Origen as an originally orthodox Christian who had been corrupted and turned into a heretic by the evils of "Greek education". Epiphanius particularly objected to Origen's subordinationism, his "excessive" use of allegorical hermeneutic, and his habit of proposing ideas about the Bible "speculatively, as exercises" rather than "dogmatically".

Epiphanius asked John, the bishop of Jerusalem, to condemn Origen as a heretic. John refused on the grounds that a person could not be retroactively condemned as a heretic after that person had already died. In 393, a monk named Atarbius advanced a petition to have Origen and his writings censured. Tyrannius Rufinus, a priest at the monastery on the Mount of Olives who had been ordained by John of Jerusalem and was a longtime admirer of Origen, rejected the petition outright. Rufinus's close friend and associate Jerome, who had also studied Origen, however, came to agree with the petition. Around the same time, John Cassian, an Eastern monk, introduced Origen's teachings to the West.

In 394, Epiphanius wrote to John of Jerusalem, again asking for Origen to be condemned, insisting that Origen's writings denigrated human sexual reproduction and accusing him of having been an Encratite. John once again denied this request. By 395, Jerome had allied himself with the anti-Origenists and begged John of Jerusalem to condemn Origen, a plea which John once again refused. Epiphanius launched a campaign against John, openly preaching that John was an Origenist deviant. He successfully persuaded Jerome to break communion with John and ordained Jerome's brother Paulinianus as a priest in defiance of John's authority.

In 397, Rufinus published a Latin translation of Origen's On First Principles. Rufinus was convinced that Origen's original treatise had been interpolated by heretics and that these interpolations were the source of the heterodox teachings found in it. He therefore heavily modified Origen's text, omitting and altering any parts which disagreed with contemporary Christian orthodoxy. In the introduction to this translation, Rufinus mentioned that Jerome had studied under Origen's disciple Didymus the Blind, implying that Jerome was a follower of Origen. Jerome was so incensed by this that he resolved to produce his own Latin translation of On the First Principles, in which he promised to translate every word exactly as it was written and lay bare Origen's heresies to the whole world. Jerome's translation has been lost in its entirety.

In 399, the Origenist crisis reached Egypt. Pope Theophilus I of Alexandria was sympathetic to the supporters of Origen and the church historian, Sozomen, records that he had openly preached the Origenist teaching that God was incorporeal. In his Festal Letter of 399, he denounced those who believed that God had a literal, human-like body, calling them illiterate "simple ones". A large mob of Alexandrian monks who regarded God as anthropomorphic rioted in the streets. According to the church historian Socrates Scholasticus, in order to prevent a riot, Theophilus made a sudden about-face and began denouncing Origen. In 400, Theophilus summoned a council in Alexandria, which condemned Origen and all his followers as heretics for having taught that God was incorporeal, which they decreed contradicted the only true and orthodox position, which was that God had a literal, physical body resembling that of a human.

Theophilus labeled Origen as the "hydra of all heresies" and persuaded Pope Anastasius I to sign the letter of the council, which primarily denounced the teachings of the Nitrian monks associated with Evagrius Ponticus. In 402, Theophilus expelled Origenist monks from Egyptian monasteries and banished the four monks known as the "Tall Brothers", who were leaders of the Nitrian community. John Chrysostom, the patriarch of Constantinople, granted the Tall Brothers asylum, a fact which Theophilus used to orchestrate John's condemnation and removal from his position at the Synod of the Oak in July 403. Once John Chrysostom had been deposed, Theophilus restored normal relations with the Origenist monks in Egypt and the first Origenist crisis came to an end.

Second Origenist Crisis

The Second Origenist Crisis occurred in the sixth century, during the height of Byzantine monasticism. Although the Second Origenist Crisis is not nearly as well documented as the first, it seems to have primarily concerned the teachings of Origen's later followers, rather than what Origen had written. Origen's disciple Evagrius Ponticus had advocated contemplative, noetic prayer, but other monastic communities prioritized asceticism in prayer, emphasizing fasting, labors, and vigils. Some Origenist monks in Palestine, referred to by their enemies as "Isochristoi" (meaning "those who would assume equality with Christ"), emphasized Origen's teaching of the pre-existence of souls and held that all souls were originally equal to Christ's and would become equal again at the end of time. Another faction of Origenists in the same region instead insisted that Christ was the "leader of many brethren", as the first-created being. This faction was more moderate, and they were referred to by their opponents as "Protoktistoi" ("first createds"). Both factions accused the other of heresy, and other Christians accused both of them of heresy.

The Protoktistoi appealed to the Emperor Justinian I to condemn the Isochristoi of heresy through Pelagius, the papal apocrisarius. In 543, Pelagius presented Justinian with documents, including a letter denouncing Origen written by Patriarch Mennas of Constantinople, along with excerpts from Origen's On First Principles and several anathemata against Origen. A domestic synod convened to address the issue concluded that the Isochristoi's teachings were heretical and, seeing Origen as the ultimate culprit behind the heresy, denounced Origen as a heretic as well. Emperor Justinian ordered for all of Origen's writings to be burned. In the west, the Decretum Gelasianum, which was written sometime between 519 and 553, listed Origen as an author whose writings were to be categorically banned.

In 553, during the early days of the Second Council of Constantinople (the Fifth Ecumenical Council), when Pope Vigilius was still refusing to take part in it despite Justinian holding him hostage, the bishops at the council ratified an open letter which condemned Origen as the leader of the Isochristoi. The letter was not part of the official acts of the council, and it more or less repeated the edict issued by the Synod of Constantinople in 543. It cites objectionable writings attributed to Origen, but all the writings referred to in it were actually written by Evagrius Ponticus. After the council officially opened, but while Pope Vigillius was still refusing to take part, Justinian presented the bishops with the problem of a text known as The Three Chapters, which attacked the Antiochene Christology.

The bishops drew up a list of anathemata against the heretical teachings contained within The Three Chapters and those associated with them. In the official text of the eleventh anathema, Origen is condemned as a Christological heretic, but Origen's name does not appear at all in the Homonoia, the first draft of the anathemata issued by the imperial chancery, nor does it appear in the version of the conciliar proceedings that was eventually signed by Pope Vigillius, a long time afterwards. Norman P. Tanner's edition of the Decrees of the Ecumenical Councils (Georgetown University Press, 1990) says: "Our edition does not include the text of the anathemas against Origen since recent studies have shown that these anathemas cannot be attributed to this council." These discrepancies may indicate that Origen's name was retrospectively inserted into the text after the council. Some authorities believe these anathemata belong to an earlier local synod. Even if Origen's name did appear in the original text of the anathema, the teachings attributed to Origen that are condemned in the anathema were actually the ideas of later Origenists, which had very little grounding in anything Origen had actually written. In fact, Popes Vigilius, Pelagius I, Pelagius II, and Gregory the Great were only aware that the Fifth Council specifically dealt with The Three Chapters and make no mention of Origenism or universalism, nor spoke as if they knew of its condemnation—even though Gregory the Great was opposed to universalism.

After the Anathemas

As a direct result of the numerous condemnations of his work, only a tiny fraction of Origen's voluminous writings have survived. Nonetheless, these writings still amount to a massive number of Greek and Latin texts, very few of which have yet been translated into English. Many more writings have survived in fragments through quotations from later Church Fathers. Even in the late 14th Century, Francesc Eiximenis in his Llibre de les dones, produced otherwise unknown quotations from Origen, which may be evidence of other works surviving into the Late Medieval period. It is likely that the writings containing Origen's most unusual and speculative ideas have been lost to time, making it nearly impossible to determine whether Origen actually held the heretical views which the anathemas against him ascribed to him. Nonetheless, in spite of the decrees against Origen, the church remained enamored of him and he remained a central figure of Christian theology throughout the first millennium. He continued to be revered as the founder of Biblical exegesis, and anyone in the first millennium who took the interpretation of the scriptures seriously would have had knowledge of Origen's teachings.

Jerome's Latin translations of Origen's homilies were widely read in western Europe throughout the Middle Ages, and Origen's teachings greatly influenced those of the Byzantine monk Maximus the Confessor and the Irish theologian John Scotus Eriugena. Since the Renaissance, the debate over Origen's orthodoxy has continued to rage. Basilios Bessarion, a Greek refugee who fled to Italy after the Fall of Constantinople in 1453, produced a Latin translation of Origen's Contra Celsum, which was printed in 1481. Major controversy erupted in 1487, after the Italian humanist scholar Giovanni Pico della Mirandola issued a thesis arguing that "it is more reasonable to believe that Origen was saved than he was damned." A papal commission condemned Pico's position on account of the anathemas against Origen, but not until after the debate had received considerable attention.

The most prominent advocate of Origen during the Renaissance was the Dutch humanist scholar Desiderius Erasmus, who regarded Origen as the greatest of all Christian authors and wrote in a letter to John Eck that he learned more about Christian philosophy from a single page of Origen than from ten pages of Augustine. Erasmus especially admired Origen for his lack of rhetorical flourishes, which were so common in the writings of other Patristic authors. Erasmus borrowed heavily from Origen's defense of free will in On First Principles in his 1524 treatise On Free Will, now considered his most important theological work. In 1527, Erasmus translated and published the portion of Origen's Commentary on the Gospel of Matthew that survived only in Greek and in 1536, he published the most complete edition of Origen's writings that had ever been published at that time. While Origen's emphasis on the human effort in attaining salvation appealed to the Renaissance humanists, it made him far less appealing to the proponents of the Reformation. Martin Luther deplored Origen's understanding of salvation as irredeemably defective and declared "in all of Origen there is not one word about Christ." Consequently, he ordered for Origen's writings to be banned. Nonetheless, the earlier Czech reformer Jan Hus had taken inspiration from Origen for his view that the church is a spiritual reality rather than an official hierarchy, and Luther's contemporary, the Swiss reformer Huldrych Zwingli, took inspiration from Origen for his interpretation of the Eucharist as symbolic.

In the seventeenth century, the English Cambridge Platonist Henry More was a devoted Origenist, and although he did reject the notion of universal salvation, he accepted most of Origen's other teachings. Pope Benedict XVI expressed admiration for Origen, describing him in a sermon as part of a series on the Church Fathers as "a figure crucial to the whole development of Christian thought", "a true 'maestro'", and "not only a brilliant theologian but also an exemplary witness of the doctrine he passed on". He concludes the sermon by inviting his audience to "welcome into your hearts the teaching of this great master of the faith". Modern Protestant evangelicals admire Origen for his passionate devotion to the scriptures but are frequently baffled or even appalled by his allegorical interpretation of them, which many believe ignores the literal, historical truth behind them.

Origen is often noted for being one of the few Church Fathers who is not generally regarded as a saint. Nevertheless, there are notable individuals who referred to Origen as St. Origen. This includes Anglicans such as Edward Welchman, John Howson and Sir Winston Churchill; Calvinists such as Pierre Bayle, Georges-Louis Liomin and Heinrich Bullinger; American scholar and Orthodox Christian David Bentley Hart; Oriental Orthodox such as Pope Shenouda III of Alexandria, Fr. Tadros Yakoup Malaty and the Coptic Orthodox Diocese of the Southern United States. Origen's father, Saint Leonides of Alexandria, has a feast day on April 22 in the Catholic tradition, and the Evangelical Church in Germany celebrates April 27 as Origen's feast day.

Translations

 The Commentary of Origen On S. John's Gospel, the text revised and with a critical introduction and indices, A. E. Brooke (2 volumes, Cambridge University Press, 1896): Volume 1, Volume 2
 Contra Celsum, trans Henry Chadwick, (Cambridge: Cambridge University Press, 1965)
 On First Principles, trans GW Butterworth, (Gloucester, MA: Peter Smith, 1973) also trans John Behr (Oxford University Press, 2019) from the Rufinus trans.
 Origen: An Exhortation to Martyrdom; Prayer; First Principles, book IV; Prologue to the Commentary on the Song of Songs; Homily XXVII on Numbers, trans R Greer, Classics of Western Spirituality, (1979)
 Origen: Homilies on Genesis and Exodus, trans RE Heine, FC 71, (1982)
 Origen: Commentary on the Gospel according to John, Books 1–10, trans RE Heine, FC 80, (1989)
 Treatise on the Passover and Dialogue of Origen with Heraclides and his Fellow Bishops On the Father, the Son and the Soul, trans Robert Daly, ACW 54 (New York: Paulist Press, 1992)
 Origen: Commentary on the Gospel according to John, Books 13–32, trans RE Heine, FC 89, (1993)
 The Commentaries on Origen and Jerome on St Paul's Epistle to the Ephesians, RE Heine, OECS, (Oxford: OUP, 2002)
 The Commentary of Origen on the Gospel of St Matthew, 2 vols., trans RE Heine, OECS, (Oxford: OUP, 2018)
 Commentary on the Epistle to the Romans Books 1–5, 2001, Thomas P. Scheck, trans., The Fathers of the Church series, Volume 103, Catholic University of America Press,   
 Commentary on the Epistle to the Romans Books 6–10 (Fathers of the Church), 2002, The Fathers of the Church, Thomas P. Scheck, trans., Volume 104, Catholic University of America Press,   
 On Prayer in Tertullian, Cyprian and Origen, "On the Lord's Prayer", trans and annotated by Alistair Stewart-Sykes, (Crestwood, NY: St Vladimir's Seminary Press, 2004), pp. 111–214

Translations available online
 Translations of some of Origen's writings can be found in Ante-Nicene Fathers or in The Fathers of the Church. Material not in those collections includes:
 Dialogue with Heracleides
 On Prayer
 Philocalia

See also
 Adamantius (Pseudo-Origen)
 Allegorical interpretations of Plato
 Apocatastasis
 Descriptions in antiquity of the execution cross
 Pre-existence of the soul
 Priesthood of all believers

Notes

References

Bibliography

Further reading
 Bigg, Charles. The Christian Platonists of Alexandria. 1886, revised 1913.
 
 Martens, Peter. Origen and Scripture: The Contours of the Exegetical Life. Oxford: Oxford University Press, 2012.
 
 Pelikan, Jaroslav. The Emergence of the Catholic Tradition: 100–600. Chicago: University of Chicago Press, 1977.
 
 von Balthasar, Hans Urs. Origen, Spirit and Fire: A Thematic Anthology of His Writings. Washington, DC: Catholic University of America Press, 1984.
 Westcott, B. F. "Origenes", Dictionary of Christian Biography.
 Williams, Rowan. "Origen: Between Orthodoxy and Heresy", in W. A. Bienert and U. Kuhneweg, eds., Origeniana Septima, 1999, pp. 3–14.

External links

 Analysis and criticism
 Modern
 Coptic Church on Origen 
 The two-part Roman Catholic meditation on Origen by Pope Benedict XVI: April 25, 2007 and May 2, 2007.
Ancient
 The Anathemas Against Origen
 Evagrius Ponticus and the Condemnation of Origen
 Derivative summaries

 Edward Moore, Origen Entry in Internet Encyclopedia of Philosophy
 
 
 Origen from New Schaff-Herzog Encyclopedia of Religious Knowledge
Bibliography
 EarlyChurch.org.uk Extensive bibliography and on-line articles.
Original texts
 Greek and Latin Opera Omnia by Migne Patrologia Graeca, with Analytical Indexes and Concordances (Lexicon Proprium)
Other resources
Table of Origen's Works with Links to Texts and Translations
Morwenna Ludlow Lecture on Origen for St John's College, Nottingham, June 13, 2016
 

 
184 births
253 deaths
2nd-century Egyptian people
3rd-century Egyptian people
3rd-century philosophers
3rd-century writers
Amillennialism
Ancient Christians involved in controversies
Christian anti-Gnosticism
Ascetics
Christian pacifists
Christian universalist theologians
Church Fathers
Egyptian philosophers
Egyptian theologians
Hermeneutists
Late Antique writers
Neoplatonists
People declared heretics by the first seven ecumenical councils
Roman-era Greeks
Anglican saints
Oriental Orthodox saints
People celebrated in the Lutheran liturgical calendar
Systematic theologians